The Contemporary Art Galleries Association (AGAC) is a non-profit organization created in 1985, whose head office is located in Montreal.

Members
AGAC regroups galleries in Halifax, Montréal, Québec, Ottawa, Toronto, Edmonton, Calgary and Vancouver.

Members:

 Art Mûr  (Montréal)
 Art45  (Montréal)
 Beaux-arts des Amériques (Montréal)
 Blouin Division (Montréal)
 Bradley Ertaskiran  (Montréal)
 Christie Contemporary  (Toronto)
 DURAN | MASHAAL (Montréal)
 ELLEPHANT  (Montréal)
 Equinox Gallery (Vancouver)
 Feheley Fine Arts (Toronto)
 Galerie 3 (Québec)
 Galerie Bernard (Montréal)
 Galerie C.O.A.  (Montréal)
 Galerie d'art Yves Laroche  (Montréal)
 Galerie D'Este  (Montréal)
 Galerie Éric Devlin (Montréal)
 Galerie Hugues Charbonneau  (Montréal)
 Galerie Jean-Claude Bergeron  (Ottawa)
 Galerie Michel Guimont  (Québec)
 Galerie Robert Poulin (Montréal)
 Galerie Robertson Arès  (Montréal)
 Galerie Simon Blais (Montréal)
 Galerie Youn  (Montréal)
 Galeries Roger Bellemare et Christian Lambert  (Montréal)
 General Hardware Contemporary  (Toronto)
 La Castiglione  (Montréal)
 Lacerte art contemporain  (Montréal)
 Laroche/Joncas  (Montréal)
 McBride Contemporain  (Montréal)
 Patel Brown (Toronto)
 Patrick Mikhail  (Montréal)
 Paul Petro Contemporary Art (Toronto)
 Pierre-François Ouellette art contemporain (Montréal)
 Projet Pangée  (Montréal)
 Stephen Bulger Gallery (Toronto)
 Studio 21 Fine Art  (Halifax)
 TrépanierBaer Gallery (Calgary)
 VIVIANEART  (Calgary)

Awards

AGAC also presents the following awards in association with the Ville de Montréal: Prix Louis-Comtois and Prix Pierre-Ayot.

 Prix Louis-Comtois

The Prix Louis-Comtois was created in 1991 to recognize excellence in visual arts and craft. The award, which is overseen jointly by AGAC and the Ville de Montréal, supports and promotes the work of an artist who has distinguished himself or herself in Montreal's contemporary art scene throughout the past 15 years.

Recipients of the Prix Louis-Comtois:

 2020: Chih-Chien Wang 
 2019: Milutin Gubash 
 2018: Cynthia Girard-Renard 
 2017: Sophie Jodoin
 2016: Aude Moreau 
 2015: Nicolas Baier 
 2014: Patrick Bernatchez 
 2013: Manon LaBrecque  
 2012: Jean-Pierre Gauthier 
 2011: Marie-Claude Bouthillier 
 2010: Valérie Blass 
 2009: Daniel Olson
 2008: Massimo Guerrera 
 2007: François Morelli 
 2006: Alexandre David 
 2005: Claire Savoie 
 2004: Stephen Schofield 
 2003: Richard-Max Tremblay 
 2002: Alain Paiement 
 2001: Roberto Pellegrinuzzi 
 2000: Guy Pellerin 
 1999: Sylvie Laliberté 
 1998: Rober Racine 
 1997: Pierre Dorion 
 1996: Marie-France Brière 
 Prix Pierre-Ayot

The Prix Pierre-Ayot was created in 1996 by the Ville de Montréal, in partnership with the Contemporary Art Galleries Association, to promote excellence among Montreal's new visual arts creators, to foster the dissemination of the work of young artists in the city's galleries and artist-run spaces, and to recognize the efforts of presenters to support up-and-coming artists. This award is intended for artists who are in the early stages of their career. It honours their exceptional workmanship and original contribu¬tion in painting, printing, drawing, illustration, photography or other mediums.

Recipients of the Prix Pierre-Ayot:

 2020: Caroline Monnet
 2019: Nadège Grebmeier-Forget 
 2018: Adam Basanta 
 2017: Celia Perrin Sidarous 
 2016: Nicolas Grenier 
 2015: Jon Rafman
 2014: Julie Favreau 
 2013: Kim Waldron 
 2012: Jacynthe Carrier
 2011: Olivia Boudreau 
 2010: Alana Riley 
 2009: Gwénaël Bélanger 
 2008: Étienne Zack 
 2007: Patrick Coutu 
 2006: Raphaëlle de Groot
 2005: Emmanuelle Léonard
 2004: Jérôme Fortin 
 2003: Pascal Grandmaison
 2002: Michel De Broin
 2001: Nathalie Grimard 
 2000: Nicolas Baier 
 1999: Emmanuel Galland 
 1998: Marc Séguin
 1997: Stéphanie Béliveau 
 1996: Nadine Norman

References

Organizations based in Montreal
 
Arts organizations based in Canada